is a Japanese manga series written and illustrated by Yayū Murata. It was originally a one-shot published in Houbunsha's seinen manga  magazine Weekly Manga Times in April 2018, before being serialized in the same magazine from July 2018 to December 2022. The series has been collected into fourteen tankōbon volumes. A television drama adaptation aired from January to March 2022. An anime adaptation has been announced.

Media

Manga
Written and illustrated by Yayū Murata, Tsuma, Shōgakusei ni Naru was initially a one-shot published in Houbunsha's seinen manga  magazine Weekly Manga Times on April 27, 2018. It was serialized in the same magazine from July 27, 2018, to December 2, 2022. Fourteen tankōbon volumes were published from April 2019 to March 2023.

Volume list

Drama
A television drama adaptation was announced on November 3, 2021. It was directed by Toshio Tsuboi, Takeyoshi Yamamoto, Maiko Ōuchi, and Naoki Katō, based on a screenplay by Satomi Ōshima. Yoshihiko Nakai and Chie Masuda served as the producers. The series aired on TBS from January 21 to March 25, 2022. Yuga performed the theme song .

Yako, Shōgakusei ni Naru, a spin-off series featuring an original story, was released on the Japanese streaming service Paravi from February 11 to March 25, 2022. Hidetaka Sakamoto, Hiroyuki Tamekawa, and Saya Hirosawa directed the series from a screenplay by Masashi Suwa.

Anime
An anime adaptation was announced on March 16, 2023.

Reception
In 2019, Tsuma, Shōgakusei ni Naru ranked 11th at the fifth Next Manga Awards in the print category.

References

External links
  
 

2022 Japanese television series debuts
2022 Japanese television series endings
Anime series based on manga
Fiction about reincarnation
Houbunsha manga
Kin'yō Dorama
Manga adapted into television series
Seinen manga